The history of the Jews in Libya stretches back to the 3rd century BCE, when Cyrenaica was under Greek rule. The Jewish population of Libya, a part of the Sephardi-Maghrebi Jewish community continued to populate the area continuously until the modern times. During World War II, Libya's Jewish population was subjected to anti-semitic laws by the Fascist Italian regime and deportations by Nazi German troops.

After the war, anti-Jewish violence caused many Jews to leave the country, principally for Israel, though significant numbers moved to Italy and North America. Under Colonel Muammar Gaddafi, who ruled the country from 1969 to 2011, the situation deteriorated further, eventually leading to the emigration of the remaining Jewish population. The last Jew in Libya, 80-year-old Rina Debach, left the country in 2003.

Ancient history

The oldest trace of a Jewish existence in Libya appears in Sirte, which some archaeological surveys made on the "Barion" region there dated its synagogue to the 10th century BCE, during King Solomon's reign.

Major Jewish settlement of Libya took place in the 4th century BCE. Ptolemaic Egypt had gained a large Jewish population after Ptolemy I Soter's invasion of Judea, during which many Jews were carried off as war captives before later being freed, as well as voluntary Jewish emigration to Egypt for economic reasons and Ptolemy's tolerant policies which followed afterward. In 312 BCE, Ptolemy settled many Jews in Cyrenaica to strengthen his kingdom.

There is evidence of Jews living in Benghazi from 13 BCE. They were considered citizens, but were ruled by a Jewish archon unlike the rest of the Jews in that area.

In 146 BCE inscriptions found at Benghazi and elsewhere in Libya, give details about wealthy, well established and organised Jewish communities.

During the Greco-Roman period, Libya corresponded approximately with Cyrene and the territory belonging to it. Jews lived there, including many that moved there from Egypt; Augustus granted Cyrene's Jewish population certain privileges through Flavius, the governor of the province. At the time, they maintained close contact with the Jews in Jerusalem. In 73 CE, during the First Jewish–Roman War in Judea, there was also a revolt by the Jewish community in Cyrene led by Jonathan the Weaver, which was quickly suppressed by the governor Catullus. Jonathan was denounced to the governor of Pentapolis. In vengeance, the Romans killed him and many wealthy Jews in Cyrene. Several Libyan Jews from around this period are known today, such as Jason of Cyrene, whose work is the source of the Second Book of Maccabees, and Simon of Cyrene, who is believed to have carried the cross of Jesus as he was taken to his crucifixion.

In 115 CE, another Jewish revolt, known as Kitos War, broke out not only in Cyrene, but also in Egypt and Cyprus.

According to Jewish tradition, after the Bar-Kokhba revolt of 132-135 AD, the Romans deported twelve boatloads of Jews from Judea to Cyrenaica. Approximately half a million Jews are thought to have already been living there at the time. Most lived in farming villages while those by the sea were often sailors. Many others were potters, stonemasons, weavers, and merchants.

The Spaniards, who conquered Libya in 1510 and held it for a brief period, drove some of the Jews to the mountain areas of Gharian and Tajura. Others were taken as prisoners and tortured under the laws of the inquisition, whilst others were taken to Naples and sold as slaves.

Modern times

Ottoman rule
During the Ottoman period, Jewish families from Tripoli were attracted to Benghazi. This period gave new life and impetus to the Libyan Jewish community.

In 1745 epidemics and poverty drove out the inhabitants, but around 1,750 members of the previous Jewish community returned and reconstructed the community, which began to flourish with the arrival of Jewish families from Italy.

In the 18th and 19th centuries Benghazi had 400 Jewish families divided into two groups, those of the town and the surrounding region and those who were born in Tripoli and Italy, they both recognised the authority of one rabbi, but each had its own synagogue.

The Muslim brotherhood of the Sanusiya was well-disposed toward the Jews of Benghazi, appreciating their economic-mercantile contributions and their peaceful attitude. The community enjoyed a complete freedom, and were not forced to live in a special quarter. Because of their commercial activity the town became an important trading centre for Europe and Africa.

Italian rule

In 1903, the records of the Alliance Israelite Universelle show 14,000 Jews living in Tripoli and 2,000 in Benghazi. In comparison to Zionist activities in other Arab countries, Zionism started early in Libya and was extensive, it followed by many activities such as exchanging of letters concerning Zionism matters between Benghazi and Tripoli during the period 1900–1904. An organization had been set up for the dissemination of the Hebrew in Tripoli and young people from the Benghazi community came to study there. The meeting between the young Jews of Benghazi and the Tripolitanian Zionists bore fruit in the form of a “Talmud Torah” which was an evening school in Tripoli.

In 1911, Libya was colonised by Italy. By 1931, there were 21,000 Jews living in the country (4% of the total population of 550,000), mostly in Tripoli. The situation for the Jews was generally good. But, in the late 1939, the Fascist Italian regime began passing anti-Semitic laws. As a result of these laws, Jews were fired from government jobs, some were dismissed from government schools, and their citizenship papers were stamped with the words "Jewish race."

In the 1920s a few incidents that linked to the Arab-Jewish conflict in Palestine were reported. The incidents occurred in Tripoli and Benghazi, those which occurred in Tripoli were not so serious comparing to the ones in Benghazi. According to Gustavo Calo, the chief rabbi of Benghazi, there were actually an attempted pogrom but according to the opinion of Elia Fargion the president of the community, this assessment was exaggerated.

Data from 1931 indicates that spoken Italian was relatively widespread across the Jewish population. In Benghazi, 67.1 percent of Jewish men and 40.8 percent of Jewish women spoke Italian, compared to 34.5 percent of Arab males and 1.6 percent of females.

In 1934, a chapter of Ben-Yehuda was established in Benghazi, first as a soccer team and later with cultural activities, such as the commemoration of Jewish holidays and Zionist Festivities.

In the late 1930s, Fascist anti-Jewish laws were gradually enforced, and Jews were subject to terrible repression.

Until 1936 life under Italian rule proceeded peacefully for the Jews. In 1936, however, the Italians began to enforce fascist legislation, aimed at modernising social and economic structures, based on conditions current in Italy. With the implementation of anti-Jewish racial legislation in late 1938, Jews were removed from municipal councils, public offices, and state schools and their papers stamped with the words "Jewish race."

German influence in Libya had been felt since 1938. However, Germany's direct involvement in the colonial authorities’ affairs and management did not completely materialise until 1941. It was only when Italy entered the war in 1940 that Libya became subjected to direct Fascist-Nazi collaboration and “Nazi-Style” deportations.

Despite this repression, 25% of the population of Tripoli was still Jewish in 1941 and 44 synagogues were maintained in the city. In 1942, German troops fighting the Allies in North Africa occupied the Jewish quarter of Benghazi, plundering shops and deporting more than 2,000 Jews across the desert. Sent to work in labor camps, more than one-fifth of this group of Jews perished. Jews were concentrated in the cities of Tripoli and Benghazi, with small communities in Bayda and Misrata.

The worst experience for Libyan Jews in the war was the internment of Cyrenaican Jews in Giado, a concentration camp located 235 kilometres from Tripoli. In January 1942, the Italian authorities began to apply Mussolini’s “Sfollamento” (evacuation) order to Libyan Jews. Mussolini ordered the Jews of Benghazi, Derna, Tobruk, Barce, Susa and other towns in the region to be sent to a concentration camp in Gharian in retaliation. An eyewitness described these horrifying moments: “In the synagogue they started hanging up lists every day of 20-30 families that had to leave...They took Jews from Benghazi and from the vicinity: Derna, Brace, Tobruk...The journey took five days. We travelled about 2,000 km. from Benghazi to Giado. They took us like animals to the slaughter house. Forty people in each truck and each truck had two Italian policemen. They took only Jews. According to the rumour it was the Germans who gave the order”.

In June 1942, the execution of Mussolini's orders was completed and all Cyrenaican Jews were transferred to Giado.

The living conditions in the camp were deplorable, bringing about infection and illness and, consequently, plagues that killed numerous people in the camp. They were buried on a valley nearby that used to be a burial place of Jews hundreds of years ago.

In addition to the camp's poor conditions, the behaviour of the Italian officers did not spare any type of humiliation, oppression and abuse especially on Friday nights when the Maresciallo patrolled the buildings and saw the special food of the Sabbath, he used to kick it and spill it on the floor or urinate on it and thus a few families remained without food for the whole Sabbath. (4)

Allied control and after World War II

On January 24, 1943, the British liberated the camp and immediately undertook emergency measures to control the plague of typhus and lice that already killed 562 of its inhabitants. The British military decided to evacuate Giado between the spring and summer of 1943. The Jews were first evacuated from the camp to better housing in the vicinity, to receive medical care and be properly fed. Then gradually each week, a number of families was selected to be put on trucks and sent back to their homes. The expenses for transport of these Jews back to Cyrenaica and the initial assistance were financed by the American Jewish Joint Distribution Committee.

Upon the establishment of British rule on January 23, 1943, the Jewish community was in a deplorable economic, social and psychological state. The demeaning effects of the Italian racial laws, war and concentration camps took a heavy toll on the Jewish community.

The British also boosted the spirits of the Jews with promises to repatriate them to their homes in Benghazi, and giving them the chance to rehabilitate their lives. After full repatriation of Benghazi Jews it was reported that there were 3,400 Jews in Benghazi (before the war, in June 1939 the Jewish community of Benghazi numbered 3,653). Yet many of the Jews who returned to Benghazi were unemployed, while those with jobs were unable to support themselves on what they earned. The Benghazi Jewish community suffered more than any other Jewish community in Libya since it was hit harder by the perils of war.

Some of the worst anti-Jewish violence occurred in the years following the liberation of North Africa by Allied troops. From 5 to 7 November 1945, more than 140 Jews were killed and many more injured in a pogrom in Tripolitania. The rioters looted nearly all of the city's synagogues and destroyed five of them, along with hundreds of homes and businesses. In June 1948, anti-Jewish rioters killed another 12 Jews and destroyed 280 Jewish homes. This time, however, the Libyan Jewish community had prepared to defend itself. Jewish self-defence units fought back against the rioters, preventing more deaths.

Both in November 1945 and June 1948 the Jews of Benghazi did not suffer anti-Jewish pogroms at the hands of Arabs similar to the Jews of Tripoli, though small-scale incidents did occur. Thus, several Jews were beaten up in mid-June 1948, a shop was looted, and a fire broke out in a synagogue, but the local police introduced order and there was no need for the British Army to intervene.

Once emigration to Israel was permitted in early 1949, the majority of the community of 2,500 Jews in Benghazi emigrated to Israel through the end of 1951.

The general environment during the years after the emigration to Israel, was generally positive, no special events, riots or pogrom occurred during this period between 1949 and 1967 and it estimated that 200 Jews Lived in Benghazi during that time.

In the late 1940s, some 40,000 Jews lived in Libya. The Libyan Jewish community suffered great insecurity during this period. The founding of Israel in 1948, as well as Libya's independence from Italy in 1951 and subsequent admission into the Arab League, led many Jews to emigrate. From 1948 to 1951, and especially after emigration became legal in 1949, 30,972 Jews moved to Israel.

Kingdom of Libya
On 31 December 1958, the Jewish Community Council was dissolved by law. In 1961, a new law was passed requiring a special permit to prove true Libyan citizenship, which was, however, denied to all but six Jewish inhabitants of the country. Additional laws were enacted allowing the seizure of property and assets of Libyan Jews who had immigrated to Israel.

In 1964, letters to US Senator Jacob Javits from Jewish United States Air Force personnel serving on Wheelus Air Base, a US Air Force facility in Libya, revealed the extent of antisemitic sentiment in the country. The letters revealed that children and dependents of Jewish personnel living off-base had to conceal their Jewish identities, fear for the physical safety of children caused the cancelation of a Jewish Sunday school program, and that the US Air Force was pressuring Jewish personnel to hide their Jewish identities and censored all material that referenced Jews, Judaism, or Israel to avoid offending most of the local population.

By 1967, the Jewish population of Libya had decreased to 7,000. After the Six-Day War between Israel and its Arab neighbours, Libyan Jews were once again the target of anti-Jewish riots. During these attacks, rioters killed 18 people and more were injured.

Leaders of the Jewish community then asked King Idris I to allow the entire Jewish population to "temporarily" leave the country; he consented, even urging them to leave. Through an airlift and the aid of several ships, the Italian Navy helped evacuate more than 6,000 Jews to Rome in one month. A few scores of Jews remained in Libya.

The evacuees were forced to leave their homes, their businesses and most of their possessions behind. Of those evacuated to Italy, about 1,300 immigrated to Israel, 2,200 stayed in Italy, and most of the rest went to the United States. The Libyan Jews who remained in Italy primarily stayed in Rome, becoming an influential part of the local Jewish community.

Gaddafi's rule
By the time Colonel Muammar Gaddafi came to power in 1969, roughly 100 Jews remained in Libya. Under his rule, all Jewish property was confiscated, and all debts to Jews were cancelled. In 1970, the Libyan government declared the Day of Revenge, which celebrated the expulsion of Jews and Italians from Libya, a national holiday. Despite emigration being prohibited, most of the remaining Jews succeeded in escaping the country and by 1974, only 20 Jews remained in Libya.

In 2002, the last known Jew in Libya, Esmeralda Meghnagi, died. In the same year, however, it was discovered that Rina Debach, a then 80-year-old Jewish woman who was born and raised in Tripoli but thought to be dead by her family in Rome, was still living in a nursing home in the country. With her ensuing departure for Rome, there were no more Jews in the country.

In 2004, Gaddafi indicated  that the Libyan government would compensate Jews who were forced to leave the country and stripped of their possessions. In October of that year he met with representatives of Jewish organizations to discuss compensation. He did, however, insist that Jews who moved to Israel would not be compensated. Some suspected these moves were motivated by his son Saif al-Islam Gaddafi, who was considered to be the likely successor of his father. In the same year, Saif had invited Libyan Jews living in Israel back to Libya, saying that they are Libyans, and that they should "leave the land they took from the Palestinians."

On 9 December, Gaddafi also extended an invitation to Moshe Kahlon, the Deputy Speaker of the Knesset and son of Libyan immigrants, to Tripoli, purportedly to discuss Jewish property in Libya. In 2010, it was claimed that Gaddafi had Jewish ancestry. Two Israeli women of Libyan-Jewish origin, a grandmother and granddaughter, came forward claiming to be relatives of Gaddafi. The grandmother claimed to be Gaddafi's second cousin. According to her, her grandmother had a sister who was married to a Jewish man, but ran away after he mistreated her, then converted to Islam and married Gaddafi's grandfather, a Muslim sheikh. The daughter of this marriage was Gaddafi's mother.

Post-Gaddafi era

In 2011, elements opposed to Gaddafi demonstrated a distinct divide in their stance toward Libyan Jews. NBC News correspondent Richard Engel, covering the conflict, estimated that as many as one in five of the rebel fighters had taken up arms against Gaddafi out of the belief that the Libyan strongman was secretly Jewish. However, National Transitional Council Chairman Mustafa Abdul Jalil invited Libyan Jewish representative David Gerbi to meet with him after the World Organization of Libyan Jews designated him the group's official delegate to the governing body. Gerbi was reportedly warmly received by Berber rebels in the Nafusa Mountains in August 2011, and an Amazigh NTC official was quoted as saying, "We want to create closer relations between Muslims and Jews. Without Jews we will never be a strong country."

On 1 October 2011, Gerbi returned to Tripoli after 44 years of exile. With the help of a U.S. security contractor and the permission of NTC fighters and three local sheikhs, Gerbi hammered down a brick wall erected to block the entrance to the city's historic Dar Bishi Synagogue. He declared it a "historic day" for Libya and told the crowd gathered there, "This is for all those who suffered under Gaddafi." However, some residents remained wary of Gerbi's intentions and were quoted by a CNN reporter as expressing distrust for Jews. Gerbi's work on the synagogue ended abruptly after two days when the terms of permission fell into dispute.

See also

 Maghrebi Jews
 History of the Jews in Carthage
 Cave-dwelling Jews
 Judeo-Tripolitanian Arabic

References

External links
 Experiences of survivor Benjamin Doron, born in Benghazi, Libya, in Yad Vashem website.
 The Jews of Libya, in Yad Vashem website.

Libya
 
Sephardi Jews topics